The brown hawker (Aeshna grandis) is a large dragonfly about   long. It is a distinctive species and is easily recognised, even in flight, by its brown body and bronze wings. At rest, blue spots on the second and third segments of the male's abdomen can be noticed; these are absent in female.

The flight time is mainly July to September. The nymph has stripes on the side of the thorax and distinct banding on the legs.

Distribution
Aeshna grandis is common in central and eastern Europe. In Europe, it can be found everywhere from Ireland to the Urals, with some exceptions like Scotland, northernmost Scandinavia and the Iberian and Apennine peninsulas. There is a population in the Balkans.

It is widespread in England but commonest in the south-east; local in Ireland and rare in Scotland. It is found on well-vegetated ponds, lakes and canals. It patrols a regular hunting territory around margins which is vigorously defended against intruders.

References

External links
 
 

Dragonflies of Europe
Aeshnidae
Insects described in 1758
Taxa named by Carl Linnaeus